Stranger in the Shogun's City: A Japanese Woman and Her World is a biographical book by Amy Stanley which was published on July 14, 2020 by Charles Scribner's Sons.

Summary 
The book is about the history of Tokyo at half of nineteenth century and also a story of discontented and rebellious woman who sacrificed everything for being there. Stranger in the Shogun's City follows from her childhood through three marriages and a famine. The full book is about that how she recreated herself by using the city.

Awards 

 PEN/Jacqueline Bograd Weld Award for Biography
 National Book Critics Circle Award for Biography
 Finalist for Pulitzer Prize for Biography or Autobiography
 Shortlisted for Baillie Gifford Prize

Critical responses and reviews 
Caroline Spalding of The Yorkshire Times wrote "Stranger in the Shogun’s City affirms its value as both an historical account and an enchanting story.". Kathryn Hughes of The Guardian wrote "Stanley works hard throughout this compelling book to make Tsuneno into a feminist heroine, a brilliant girl born ahead of her time". The book has been reviewed by Maura Elizabeth Cunningham of The Wall Street Journal, Paul Kreitman of Los Angeles Review of Books, June Teufel Dreyer of Sankei Shimbun,  Lesley Downer of The Times Literary Supplement, Richard Lloyd Parry of The Times, David Chaffetz of Asian Review of Books, Rebecca Corbett of Johns Hopkins University, Marjoleine Kars of The Washington Post.

References 

Books about Japan
Charles Scribner's Sons books
2020 books